Vidna Obmana (stylized vidnaObmana on many album covers) is a pseudonym used by Belgian composer and ambient musician Dirk Serries. The name Vidna Obmana, a phrase in Serbian, literally translates to "optical illusion" and was chosen by Serries because he felt it accurately described the music. Serries created music under the Vidna Obmana pseudonym from 1984 until 2007, when he officially retired the name. Most of his current work is released under the Fear Falls Burning pseudonym.

Vidna Obmana's music has often been described as anamorphic and organic. He uses the techniques of looping and shaping harmonies, minimizing the configurations to a few notes.

Vidna Obmana has collaborated on several occasions with artists such as Asmus Tietchens, Brannan Lane, Capriolo Trifoglio, Diego Borotti, and Steve Roach. Some of these collaborations have become entire projects of their own, such as Continuum (collaboration with Bass Communion) and Principle of Silence (collaboration with Joris De Backer).

Vidna Obmana is often cited as one of the more notable dark ambient musicians.

Discography

Solo albums
 The Ultimated Sign of Burning Death (1985) Therapie Organisatie
 Experience Artaud - Soundtrack for Experimental Theatre (1988), Mechanical Orchestration Music
 Deathchamber - Trancedreamed (1988) Mechanical Orchestration Music
 Gathering in frozen beauty (1989), The Decade Collection
 Near the flogging landscape (1990), VioletGlassOracle Tapes
 Refined on gentle clouds (1991), Direct Music
 Passage in Beauty (1991), Projekt
 Shadowing in Sorrow (1991), Projekt
 Ending Mirage (1992), Projekt
 Echoing Delight (1993)
 Revealed by composed nature (1994), Hic Sunt Leones
 The Spiritual Bonding (1994) Extreme
 The Transcending Quest (1995), Amplexus
 The River of Appearance (1996), Projekt
 Twilight of Perception (1997), Projekt
 Crossing the Trail (1997), Projekt
 Landscape in obscurity (1998), Hypnos - with Capriolo Trifoglio and Diego Borotti
 The Surreal Sanctuary (2000), Hypnos
 The Contemporary Nocturne (2000), Hypnos
 Subterranean Collective (2001), Project
 Soundtrack for the Aquarium (2001), Hypnos
 Tremor (2001), Relapse/Release
 Isolation Trip/Path of Distortion (2002), Klanggalerie (7" LP)
 Spore (2003), Relapse
 Legacy (2004), Relapse

Opera for Four Fusion Works Series
 An Opera for Four Fusion Works
 Act One: Echoes of Steel with Dreams in Exile (2002), Hypnos
 Act Two: Phrasing the Air with Bill Fox (2004), Hypnos
 Act Three: Reflection on Scale with Kenneth Kirchner (2006), Hypnos
 Act 4 (2007), Hypnos

Collaborations

With Bass Communion

 Continuum I (2005), Soleilmoon
 the continuum recyclings, volume one (2006), Tonefloat (2LP)
 Continuum II (2007), Soleilmoon
 the continuum recyclings, volume two (2010), Tonefloat (2LP)

With Big City Orchestra
 Vidna Obmana & Big City Orchestra (1989), Mechanical Orchestration Music

With Serge Devadder
 The Shape of Solitude (1999), Multimood

With Alio Die
 Echo Passage (1999), Musica Maxima Magnetica; Projekt Records (USA)

With Brannan Lane
 Deep Unknown (2002), Ambient Circle

With Dreams in Exile
 2-disc re-release of The River of Appearance (1996) with accompanying all-acoustic re-conceptualization of the album by Dreams in Exile

With Klinik
 Gluttony (2005), Hands
 Greed (2006), Hands

With Jan Marmenout
 Spirits (1999), High Gate Music

With David Lee Myers
 Tracers (2003), Klanggalerie

With Neurotic Youth
 Bleeding Wounds / Only Fear Will Survive (1986), Ladd-Frith

With PBK
 Monument of Empty Colours (1988), The Decade Collection
 Compositions : Depression & Ideal" (1989), Freedom in a Vacuum/PBK Recordings
 Fragment 3 (1991), N D

With Jeff Pearce
 True Stories (1999), Mirage

With Steve Roach
 Well of Souls (1995), Projekt – 2 discs
 Cavern of Sirens (1997), Projekt
 Ascension of Shadows (1998), Projekt (limited edition 3-disc set included Somewhere Else, re-released 2005)
 Live Archive (2000), Groove Unlimited
 Circles & Artifacts (2000), Contemptary Harmonic
 InnerZone (2002), Projekt
 Spirit Dome (2004), Projekt
 Somewhere Else (2005), Projekt

With Sam Rosenthal
 Terrace of Memories (1992), Projekt

With Djen Ajakan Shean
 Parallel Flaming (1994), Multimood
 Still Fragments (1994), ND

With Willem Tanke
 Variations for Organ, Keyboard and Processors (1999), Multimood

With Asmus Tietchens
 The Shift Recyclings (2002), Soleilmoon
 Motives for Recycling (Linear Writings, Nachtstücke Revisited) (1999), Soleilmoon
 Untitled Collaboration (1995), Syrenia

Other collaborations
 Zero Point (2001), The Foundry - by Seofon with Thermal, Stephen Kent, Robert Rich, Steve Roach, Not Breathing
 Music for Exhibiting Water with Contents – Soundtrack for the Aquarium (1992) Antwerp ZOO - Split with Hybrids
 A Thunder Orchestra / Vidna Obmana (1986), Ladd-Frith - Split release with A Thunder Orchestra
 Agoraphobic Nosebleed - PCP Torpedo ANbRx "Three Ring Inferno" - remix

Anthologies
 Noise/Drone Anthology 1984-1989 (2005), Ikon/Projekt
 Anthology 1984 - 2004 (2004), Ikon/Projekt
 Memories Compiled 2 (Near the flogging landscape, Refined on gentle clouds) (1999), Projekt: Archive
 The Trilogy (1995), Projekt: Archive - Compilation of Passage in beauty, Shadowing in sorrow and Ending Mirage Memories Compiled 1 (Monument of Empty Colours, Gathering in frozen beauty)'' (1994), Projekt: Archive - with PBK

See also 
List of ambient music artists

References

External links

 
 

Ambient musicians
Belgian composers
Male composers
Belgian male musicians
Extreme Records artists
Living people
Projekt Records artists
Relapse Records artists
Soleilmoon artists
Belgian electronic musicians
1968 births
Place of birth missing (living people)